The canton of Grasse-1 is an administrative division of the Alpes-Maritimes department, southeastern France. It was created at the French canton reorganisation which came into effect in March 2015. Its seat is in Grasse.

It consists of the following communes:

Amirat 
Andon
Briançonnet
Cabris
Caille
Collongues
Escragnolles
Gars
Grasse (partly)
Le Mas
Les Mujouls
Peymeinade
Saint-Auban
Saint-Cézaire-sur-Siagne
Saint-Vallier-de-Thiey
Séranon
Spéracèdes
Le Tignet
Valderoure

References

Cantons of Alpes-Maritimes